Williamsville North High School, known locally as "North" or "Will North" is a public high school in the Williamsville Central School District of Williamsville, New York.  The school offers a comprehensive program with multi-level instruction in many academic areas.
Robert Coniglio has been principal since July, 2020.

Admissions
The demographic breakdown of the 1,412 students enrolled in 2019–2020 was:
Male - 739
Female - 673
Native American/Alaskan - 4
Asian/Pacific islanders - 147
Black - 77
Hispanic - 57
White - 1,075
Multiracial - 50

216 students were eligible for free lunch; 26 were eligible for reduced-price lunch.

Athletics

North's boys' athletic teams are referred to as the Spartans, and the girls' teams as the Lady Spartans.

Williamsville North is a member of the ECIC-I athletic conference within Section VI of the New York State Public High School Athletic Association. North fields teams in many sports, in both the girls' and boys' divisions. Boys' sports include football, basketball, baseball, bowling, cross country, golf, ice hockey, lacrosse, gymnastics, wrestling, soccer, swimming and diving, volleyball, and track and field. Girls' sports include cross country, basketball, bowling, golf, field hockey, gymnastics, soccer, softball, volleyball, lacrosse, track and field, soccer, swimming, and diving. The school also offers cheerleading.

In 2013 the Williamsville North football team made it to the Class A Championship for the first time in school history, but lost. The Spartans defeated  Sweet Home High School in the Class A Section 6 title, the Spartans broke Sweet Homes record of winning six straight Section 6 titles in a row and 69 game winning streak against teams in Section 6.

The Williamsville North ice hockey program has won multiple Division 1 New York state titles. The team won titles in 2002, 2004, 2006, 2011, and 2017

Notable alumni
Karen Mohlke (1987), Biologist Human Genetics
Mona Bijoor (1985), businesswoman and internet entrepreneur
Lynn Schofield Clark (1982), professor of media studies at the University of Denver
Chris Gronkowski (2005), American football fullback
Dan Gronkowski (2003), American football tight end
Glenn Gronkowski (2011), American football fullback
Rob Gronkowski, (attended through junior year, did not graduate WNHS) American football tight end
Chris Hajt (1996), ice hockey defenseman
Wes Phillips, American football assistant coach
Jamey Rodemeyer, gay activist
Peter Salovey (1975), President of Yale University

References

External links
School Home Page
District Home Page

Educational institutions established in 1968
1968 establishments in New York (state)
Public high schools in New York (state)
Schools in Erie County, New York